In metric space theory and Riemannian geometry, the Riemannian circle is a great circle with a characteristic length. It is the circle equipped with the intrinsic Riemannian metric of a compact one-dimensional manifold of total length 2, or the extrinsic metric obtained by restriction of the intrinsic metric to the two-dimensional surface of the sphere, rather than the extrinsic metric obtained by restriction of the Euclidean metric to the unit circle of the two-dimensional Cartesian plane.  The distance between a pair of points on the surface of the sphere is defined to be the length of the shorter of the two arcs into which the circle is partitioned by the two points.

It is named after German mathematician Bernhard Riemann.

Properties 

The inclusion of the Riemannian circle as the equator (or any great circle) of the 2-sphere of constant Gaussian curvature +1, is an isometric imbedding in the sense of metric spaces (there is no isometric imbedding of the Riemannian circle in Hilbert space in this sense).

Gromov's filling conjecture 
A long-standing open problem, posed by Mikhail Gromov, concerns the calculation of the filling area of the Riemannian circle.  The filling area is conjectured to be 2, a value attained by the hemisphere of constant Gaussian curvature +1.

References 
 Gromov, M.: "Filling Riemannian manifolds", Journal of Differential Geometry 18 (1983), 1–147.

Riemannian geometry
Circles
Metric geometry
Bernhard Riemann